Anatoli Grigorievich Zhelezniakov (May 2, 1895 - July 26, 1919) was a Russian anarchist, Baltic sailor and revolutionary best known for dispersing the short-lived Russian Constituent Assembly on Bolshevik orders during the October Revolution.

Life

Early years 

Anatoli Zhelezniakov was born in the village of Fedoskino, in the Moscow Governorate, where his father worked as an employee on a landowner's estate. He had an older sister Alexandra and two brothers - Nikolai and Victor. Nikolai was a sailor and a notorious anarchist, Victor graduated from the Petrograd Naval School and served as the commander of the ship in the Baltic Fleet. His father died of a heart attack in May 1918 and his mother died in 1927.

Anatoli enrolled in the Lefortovo military paramedic school, but in April 1912 he refused to go to the parade in honor of the empress's name day, provoking his expulsion. He also failed at admission to the Kronstadt Naval College and began working in a pharmacy at a weaving mill in Bogorodsk, where his family had moved.

He then went to Odessa and began working as a port worker, and then as a fireman in the merchant fleet. In the summer of 1915, he worked as a mechanic, where he first engaged in clandestine propaganda work. In October 1915 he was called up for military service and enrolled in the 2nd Baltic Fleet crew. In June 1916, fearing arrest, he deserted and began work as a fireman on the merchant ships of the Black Sea Fleet, hiding under the fictitious surname "Victorsky".

Revolution and Civil War

During the fall of the tsarist government in the 1917 February Revolution, the deserters of the tsarist era returned to the navy and ended up in Kronstadt, where Anatoli Grigorievich Zhelezniakov served on a minelayer. Being a staunch anarchist by this time, he did not recognize the Russian Provisional Government and often spoke at revolutionary rallies. In May 1917, he was elected a delegate to the 1st Congress of the Baltic Fleet.

For several months following the revolution, anarchists and other revolutionaries turned the Dacha Durnovo, a private villa previously owned by Mikhail Bakunin, into a commune. In June, following an attempt by its occupants to occupy a local newspaper printing press, the government ordered the eviction of the Dacha Durnovo occupants. In response, Zhelezniakov and 49 other sailor–revolutionaries joined the Durnovo occupants to defend against the eviction. After two weeks and another occupant attack to liberate a prison, the government ordered a raid on the Durnovo villa, which killed one anarchist. Zhelezniakov was imprisoned in the Preobrazhensky Regiment barracks and sentenced to 14 years of hard labor, but within weeks of the 1917 July Days, Zhelezniakov escaped. Zhelezniakov, who followed Kropotkin and Bakunin, organized Kronstadt sailors to demonstrate at the American embassy to protest results of the San Francisco Preparedness Day Bombing trial: both Tom Mooney's death sentence and the potential extradition of Alexander Berkman.

Though he was the minelayer crew's delegate to the Second Congress of Soviets in October, he instead attended the assault on the Winter Palace with a crew of sailors, as part of the October Revolution. Zhelezniakov cooperated with the Bolshevik overthrow of the Russian Provisional Government and subsequently joined the Revolutionary Naval Committee. He also took part in battles against the Kerensky–Krasnov uprising on the outskirts of Petrograd.

In December 1917, he became deputy commander of a revolutionary detachment of sailors (450 people, 2 armored trains, 4 armored vehicles, about 40 machine guns and a searchlight team with two searchlights and a power station, commander - Nikolai Khovrin, chief of staff -Alexander Ilyin-Genevsky, Commissar - Ivan Pavlunovsky), who had already participated in the establishment of Soviet power in Petrograd, Moscow, Kharkov, and in battles near Belgorod and Chuguev. In the second half of December, part of the Khovrina-Zhelezniakov detachment returned to Petrograd and was housed in the 2nd Baltic Fleet Crew. The sailors of the detachment, distinguished by left radicalism and anarchism, were the initiators and supporters of tough measures in the fight against enemies of the Soviet government. In particular, the organizers of the later assassination of the former ministers Andrei Ivanovich Shingarev and Fyodor Kokoshkin. Lenin described the killing as "outrageous."

The detachment was used to disperse demonstrations in support of the All-Russian Constituent Assembly and was sent to the guard of the Tauride Palace, where the Constituent Assembly was held. Zhelezniakov was appointed head of the guard. On Bolshevik orders, Zhelezniakov was responsible for disbanding the Russian Constituent Assembly, telling the assembly on January 5, 1918, that, "The guard is tired." Anarchists were known opponents of both parliamentary assembly and this specific configuration. The same detachment guarded the Third All-Russian Congress of Soviets at which Zhelezniakov greeted delegates on behalf of the Petrograd garrison, the revolutionary detachments of the army and navy.

At the end of the congress, he was elected to lead the fight against the Romanian military intervention in Bessarabia and the evacuation of Russian troops and ships that were surrounded in the Danube region. He was instructed to take 5 million rubles for expenses, as well as money for the field treasury of the troops of the Romanian Front and the Black Sea Fleet. Upon arrival in the Odessa Soviet Republic, he boarded the destroyer "Daring" in Vilkovo, where the ships of the Romanian Danube Flotilla were located, and took part in the hostilities. Upon returning to Odessa in mid-February, he led a special detachment of naval forces for the defense of coastal approaches to the city. He led the arrests of hostages, captured Romanian ships, and spoke a lot at rallies. In March 1918 he was appointed commander of the fortifications at Podilsk, which included significant reserves and military units. Receiving direct instructions from the commander of the Southern Front Vladimir Antonov-Ovseyenko, he led a detachment of 1,500 sailors and soldiers and participated in the hostilities against the Austro-German forces, with the retreating forces evacuated to the rear.

Upon his return to Petrograd, he was appointed a member of the Political Department of the Naval General Staff, but in mid-June he again went to the front, this time to the Tsaritsyn area, where he was appointed commander of the First Elansky Infantry Regiment and participated in fierce battles against the Cossack troops of Pyotr Krasnov. Zhelezniakov opposed Trotsky's Red Army reorganization, which abolished self-organization and put tsarist officers in charge, as regressive. The conflict ended with his removal from the command of the regiment and Podvoisky ordered the arrest of Zhelezniakov. He was subsequently outlawed by the Bolsheviks, along with the anarchist Black Guards and Revolutionary Insurrectionary Army of Ukraine. He escaped arrest, but was forced to return to Moscow, where the Soviet Executive Committee chairman attempted to reconcile what he considered a misunderstanding by offering Zhelezniakov a high-ranking role, which he turned down. In this same period, he married Elena Nikolaevna Vind, a teacher in the Red Army.

In October 1918, under the name "Victor", he was sent to work underground in Hetmanate-controlled Odessa. Working as a mechanic at a ship repair plant and having been elected to the board of the seamen's trade union, he was actively engaged in underground campaigning and at the same time became close to Grigory Kotovsky’s fighting squad. He participated in the anti-imperialist uprising as the units of the Red Army approached. After the occupation of Odessa by the Red Army on April 6, 1919 he was elected chairman of the merchant seafarers union. At this post he concluded agreements with the owners of enterprises and facilitated the relocation of multi-family dugouts and barracks into apartments and houses vacated after mass emigration.

In early May 1919 he was appointed to the post of commander of an armored train, which he helped repair. In May - June he took part in the fight against the uprising of Nykyfor Hryhoriv, in July he was assigned to the Denikin front, where he participated in battles near Zaporizhia and Yekaterinoslav. Denikin put a contract on Zhelezniakov.

Death and funeral

On July 25, 1919, in a battle with Andrei Shkuro’s troops, the armored train under Zhelezniakov's command was ambushed by Denikin's artillery outside Ekaterinoslav. At the very last moment of the battle, when the armored train, backing up, had already escaped from the ambush, Zhelezniakov was wounded in the chest. The wound was fatal and on July 26, Anatoli Zhelezniakov died at the age of 24.

On August 3, in Moscow, the coffin holding Zhelezniakov's body was transported in an armored car, accompanied by a large number of sailors, fighting friends, comrades, acquaintances and relatives. The funeral procession proceeded from Novinskiy Boulevard, where the last farewell took place, to Vagankovo Cemetery, where his body was buried with all military honors.

Legacy 

The Soviets, who outlawed and ostracized Zhelezniakov during his life, lauded him as a hero posthumously. Speeches in Moscow accompanied his burial. The Bolsheviks later built a statue in Kronstadt to honor Zhelezniakov's role in the October Revolution. Multiple songs and poems have been penned in his honor, though his remembrance is limited to his role as a revolutionary and martyr, without mention of his anarchist affiliation. Though he has been claimed to belong to leftist groups, Zhelezniakov was an anarchist and never joined the Bolshevik party.

See also 

 Soviet destroyer Zheleznyakov, for which Zhelezniakov was the namesake

References 

1919 deaths
People of the Russian Revolution
Russian anarchists
Russian revolutionaries
Russian sailors
1895 births